Valencia Catholic University Saint Vincent Martyr (in Spanish language Universidad Católica de Valencia San Vicente Mártir) is a private, catholic university, located in Valencia, Spain. It also campuses in Valencia, Godella, Burjassot, Torrent, Alzira and Xàtiva.

The university has 26 undergraduate degrees and 58 master's. It counts with 24 research institutes and 28 local volunteer programs and two abroad.

Scholarships
The university allocates €5.4 million to scholarships. The money is destined to different aid programs, ranging from full scholarship coverage to a percentage of the scholarship coverage. The university helps students who are part of a large families.

History
It is named after Saint Vincent of Saragossa and it was established on the feast of the Immaculate Conception, December 8, 2003.

It is a continuation of the university work performed for over thirty years by the Edetania Foundation. Monsignor José María García Lahiguera, archbishop of Valencia, with the cooperation of some religious institutions, created the School of Teacher Education Edetania on November 3, 1969 and it acquired the name Edetania Foundation in January 11974. A few years later, in 1979, the then Archbishop of Valencia Monsignor Miguel Roca Canabellas and the rector of University of Valencia signed the agreement Edetania secondment to the University of Valencia.

With the foundation of the Catholic University of Valencia in 2003, the university had four faculties:
 Faculty of Education and Sport Sciences
 Faculty of Psychology and Health Sciences
 Faculty of Sociology and Human Sciences
 Faculty of Experimental Sciences

On February 4, 2005 was the integration of the School of Nursing Our Lady of the Forsaken, current School of Nursing. Also the faculty of Business Studies was approved.

On March 13, 2007, the university adopted the Faculty of Medicine.

Faculties
Faculty of Canon Law
Law School
Faculty of Nursing
Faculty of Psychology, Teaching and Education Sciences
Faculty of Sciences of Physical Activity and Sport
Faculty of Physical Therapy and Podiatry
Faculty of Philosophy, Anthropology and Social Work
Faculty of Economics and Business
Faculty of Veterinary Medicine and Experimental Sciences
Faculty of Medicine and Dentistry

Valencia Campus

It is situated in the historical center of Valencia, San Carlos Borromeo, and was built in 1760. This building, which hosts the Valencian Academy of Surgery, is located next to Valencian Museum of Enlightenment and Modernity (MUVIM). Here are the rectorate office and the central services of the university.

Classes are also taught such as:

Degree in Medicine
Degree in Dentistry
Master's Degree in Dental Aesthetics
Master's Degree in Endodontics and Restorative Dentistry
Master's Degree in Pediatric Dentistry
Master's Degree in Integral Orthodontics
Master's Degree in Oral Implantology and Surgery
Master's Degree in Development and Monitoring of National and International Clinical Trials
Master's Degree in Health Management
Master's Degree in Biobanks and Use of Biological Human Samples in Biomedical Research
Master's Degree in Marriage and Family Sciences

Santa Úrsula
It is located in the former convent of St. Ursula, founded by the Archbishop of Valencia San Juan dde Rebeira in 1605, is declared cultural interest of Torres de Quart. The monastery has been renovated and expanded. It has a floor area of 5000 sq m and is equipped with modern technology to facilitate the proper use of academic and university activities. In this place are library, laboratories, photography room, MAC room, auditorium, teacher's offices and cafeteria, as well a garden patio. Here is taught:
Degree in Social and Cultural Anthropology
Degree in Philosophy (distance learning)
Degree in Social Work
Degree in Biotechnology
Degree in Marine Sciences
Degree in Veterinary Medicine
Degree in Multimedia and Digital Arts (MAD)
Master's Degree in Bioethics
Master's Degree in Education and Rehabilitation of Addictive Behaviors
Master's Degree in Integral Care for People with Intellectual Disabilities
Master's Degree in Political Marketing and Institutional Communication
Master's Degree in Digital Creation

San Juan Bautista
Located in a classic building next to Turia Gardens and close to the bus station of Valencia. This campus has facilities for teaching and complementary activities. A language laboratory, computer lab, complete library and comfortable gardens are inside the building. Here are taught:

Master's Degree in Early Childhood Education
Degree in Speech Therapy
Degree in Psychology
Degree in Occupational Therapy
Master's Degree in Health Psychology
Master's Degree in Education and Rehabilitation of Addictive Behaviors
Master's Degree in Specialized Speech-Language Intervention
Master's Degree in Legal Psychology
Master in Music Therapy

San Juan and San Vicente
Located in an annex building of the parish of San Juan and San Vicente, it has six floors, with a ground floor and a basement, this is 2,560 sq m and has the capacity to accommodate up to 1,200 students. Here are taught:
Degree in Law
Master's Degree in Advocacy
Master's Degree in Corporate Legal Advice
Master's Degree in Administrative Management
Master's Degree in ax Law and Taxation
Master's Degree in Gender Equality
Master's Degree in Matrimonial Canon Law and Procedure

Virgin of the Helpless (Virgen de los Desamparados)
Located in a building with more than 50 years of history and near the hospital, library and MUVIM. In this center, they carry out:
Nursing Degree
Master's Degree in Deterioration of Integrity Cutaneous Ulcers and Wounds
Master in School Health

Maqués de Campo
Near Sana Ursula and (Torres de Quart), is next to the Cultural center La Beneficiencia de de Valencia and the Valencian Institute of Modern Art (IVAM). It has an inner courtyard garden, computer rooms and MAC classroom. Here are taught:

Degree in Business Administration and Management (ADE)
Degree in Economics (distance)
Degree in Economic and Financial Management (GECOFIN)
Degree in Multimedia and Digital Arts (MAD)

Edetania Campus
Godella - Sacred Heart

Colleges and degrees
Today the university is sorted into eight faculties in which there are 23 graduate degree titles and 36 post-graduate titles.

External links 

 Official website

Catholic universities and colleges in Spain
Schools in Valencia
Educational institutions established in 1996
1996 establishments in Spain